Rodolfo Torres (born 14 July 1953) is a Honduran swimmer. He competed in three events at the 1984 Summer Olympics.

References

External links
 

1953 births
Living people
Honduran male swimmers
Olympic swimmers of Honduras
Swimmers at the 1984 Summer Olympics
Place of birth missing (living people)
20th-century Honduran people